The AC 2-Litre is an automobile that was produced by AC of Thames Ditton in Surrey, England between 1947 and 1956. Two and, from 1952, four-door saloons were sold. In addition, as from 1949, a small number of drophead coupés and "Buckland" tourers were produced.

The car's wetliner, aluminium cylinder block, six-cylinder 1991 cc engine was the unit first offered by the company in the AC 16, back in 1922.

The aluminium-panelled body on a wood frame was fitted to a conventional steel chassis with rigid axles front and rear with semi-elliptic leaf springs with, for the first time on an AC, hydraulic dampers. Until 1951 the car had a hybrid braking system, hydraulic at the front and cable at the rear with  drums.

The AC 2-litre was outlived by its engine, which continued to be offered in other AC models until 1963.

The test car cost £1277 including taxes.

References

External links
 

2-litre
Rear-wheel-drive vehicles
Cars introduced in 1947
1950s cars